The 2015–16 EHF Challenge Cup is the ongoing 19th edition of the European Handball Federation's third-tier competition for men's handball clubs, running from 11 October 2015 to 22 May 2015.

Overview

Team allocation
TH: Title holders

Round and draw dates
All draws held at the European Handball Federation headquarters in Vienna, Austria.

Round 2
Teams listed first played the first leg at home. Some teams agreed to play both matches in the same venue. Bolded teams qualified into round 3.

|}

Round 3
Teams listed first played the first leg at home. Some teams agreed to play both matches in the same venue. Bolded teams qualified into last 16.

|}

Last 16
Teams listed first played the first leg at home. Some teams agreed to play both matches in the same venue. Bolded teams qualified into quarter-finals.

|}

Quarterfinals
The first legs were played on 19 and 20 March and the second legs were played on 26 and 27 March 2016.
Teams listed first played the first leg at home. Bolded teams qualified into semifinals.

|}

Semifinals
The first legs were played on 23 and 24 April and the second legs were played on 30 April and 1 May 2016. Teams listed first played the first leg at home. Bolded teams qualified into finals.

|}

Final

The first leg was played on 14 May 2016 and the second Leg was played on 21 May 2016.
Team listed first played the first leg at home.

|}

See also
2015–16 EHF Champions League
2015–16 EHF Cup

References

External links
EHF Challenge Cup (official website)

Challenge Cup
Challenge Cup
EHF Challenge Cup